Curtis "Curt" Tomasevicz (born September 17, 1980) is an American bobsledder who has competed since 2004, and a former college football player. He won six medals at the FIBT World Championships with two golds (Four-man: 2009, 2012), a silver (Mixed team: 2007) and three bronzes (Two-man: 2009, Mixed team: 2008, 2009).

Tomasevicz finished sixth in the four-man event at the 2006 Winter Olympics in Turin. He was an alternate during the (2006–07) season on World Cup tour for driver Steven Holcomb and won a gold in Cesana, Italy during the 2007–08 season.

It was announced on 15 January 2010 that he made the US team in both the two-man and four-man events at the 2010 Winter Olympics, where he won a gold medal.

Personal life
Tomasevicz earned his bachelor degree and Master of Science degree in electrical engineering with a minor in astronomy, and in December 2017 a PhD in biological systems engineering, all from the University of Nebraska-Lincoln. He played fullback and middle linebacker for the Nebraska Cornhuskers football team from 2000–2003, and was named an Academic All-Big 12 player in 2002. He comes from Shelby, Nebraska. Tomasevicz serves as an Assistant Professor in biological systems engineering at the University of Nebraska-Lincoln, and also speaks at schools around Nebraska.

Tomasevicz is a faithful Catholic who has an appreciation for the Church's longstanding and fruitful relationship with science, and an appreciation for other aspects of the Church's history.
http://www.ncregister.com/daily-news/olympic-gold-medalist-shares-sochi-experience/

References
 
 
 US Bobsleigh and Skeleton Federation announcement of the US Olympic men's bobsleigh team. January 17, 2010. Accessed January 18, 2010.
 2006 bobsleigh four-man results
 Mixed bobsleigh-skeleton world championship medalists since 2007
 From the Gridiron to G-Forces
 Engineers on the Gridiron
 Huskers.com
 http://www.ncregister.com/daily-news/olympic-gold-medalist-shares-sochi-experience/

1980 births
American male bobsledders
21st-century American engineers
Bobsledders at the 2006 Winter Olympics
Bobsledders at the 2010 Winter Olympics
Bobsledders at the 2014 Winter Olympics
Living people
Nebraska Cornhuskers football players
Olympic gold medalists for the United States in bobsleigh
People from Shelby, Nebraska
Medalists at the 2010 Winter Olympics
University of Nebraska–Lincoln alumni
Sportspeople from Nebraska
Medalists at the 2014 Winter Olympics
Olympic bronze medalists for the United States in bobsleigh